Romina Belluscio (born 19 February 1979) is an Argentine TV presenter for Antena 3.

Career
Is a TV collaborator in the TV show Espejo Publico, in the Spanish channel Antena 3. Until July, she was working in the TV show Tonterias Las Justas, in channel Cuatro. After that, she was working in the  TV show La Huella in Tucumán.

Personal life
Belluscio was born in San Miguel de Tucuman, Argentina. In 1999, she was proclaimed Miss Argentina, and then she went to Miss International, in Japan. Nowadays she is living in Madrid, Spain, and is the wife of the ex-soccer player for Real Madrid Jose Maria Gutierrez "Guti". She is also the younger sister of the Argentinean soccer player Sebastian Belluscio (Deportivo Aguilares).

References

External links 

1979 births
Living people
Association footballers' wives and girlfriends
Argentine television presenters
Argentine people of Italian descent